Sleep No More is the New York City production of an immersive work of theatre created by British theatre company Punchdrunk. It is primarily based on William Shakespeare's Macbeth, with inspiration also taken from noir films (especially those of Alfred Hitchcock), as well as some reference to the 1697 Paisley witch trials. It is expanded from their original 2003 London incarnation (at the Beaufoy Building) and their Brookline, Massachusetts 2009 collaboration with Boston's American Repertory Theatre (at the Old Lincoln School). The company reinvented Sleep No More as a co-production with Emursive, and began performances on March 7, 2011. Sleep No More won the 2011 Drama Desk Award for Unique Theatrical Experience and won Punchdrunk special citations at the 2011 Obie Awards for design and choreography.

Sleep No More adapts the story of Macbeth, deprived of nearly all spoken dialogue and set primarily in a dimly-lit, 1930s-era establishment called the McKittrick Hotel, whose website claims it has been recently "restored" but which is actually a block of warehouses in Manhattan's Chelsea neighborhood, transformed into a hotel-like performance space. Sleep No More's presentational form is considered promenade theatre, in which the audience walks at their own pace through a variety of theatrically designed rooms, as well as environmental theatre, in which the physical location, rather than being a traditional playhouse, is an imitation of the actual setting. It is also best described as immersive theatre, rather than interactive theatre, because although the audience may move through the settings, interact with the props, or observe the actors at their own pace, their interference has no bearing on the story or the performers except in rare instances.

Contrary to what some believe, Sleep No More is not any kind of haunted attraction. In their exploration, audience members can come upon instances of full nudity, bright lights (including strobe lights), lasers, fog, and haze, as well as being separated from the rest of their party. The email that guests receive upon their impending experience does note that the work is best experienced individually, and that audience members might experience "intense psychological situations."

Overview

Sleep No More is set in a building with five floors of simultaneous theatrical action, putatively called the McKittrick Hotel, though with many rooms and features not normally associated with hotels. Various papers, pamphlets and menus inside the performance space and at the building's dining establishments identify the show's setting (indoors and "outdoors") as the fictitious town of Gallow Green, Glamis, Forfar, Scotland. The name of the town and some of the characters (as seen in prop letters found in the performance space, and the show's souvenir program) are references to the Paisley witch trials.

The entrance
Guests enter the hotel through large and (save for a small plaque outside) unmarked double-doors on W. 27th Street, and travel down a dark hallway, where they check their coats and bags. Giving their name at a check-in desk, they receive a playing card as a ticket and are ushered upstairs to a brief, dimly-lit maze. Many guests see this maze as the "portal" back in time, for upon exiting they find themselves in a gaudy, richly decorated and fully operational 1930s hotel jazz bar, the Manderley. After a time, numbers corresponding to guest's cards are called. They receive their masks and file into a freight elevator, where their journey begins.

The settings
Upon leaving the elevator, guests may wander through any of the five visitable floors of settings. These floors and the characters that frequently inhabit them consist of, from the top down:
Floor 5 – The King James Sanitarium: an antiquated lunatic asylum devoid of patients, including cots, bathtubs, doctor's and nurse's offices, a padded cell, an operating theater, a gated forest with a small hut, and smaller rooms filled with patient records and samples. Frequent characters include Nurse Shaw and Matron Lang.
Floor 4 – The High Street of Gallow Green: featuring a two-room apartment, and shops belonging to Mr. Bargarran (a taxidermist), Mr. Fulton (a tailor), Mr. Robertson (a mortician), and Mrs. Ashleigh (a confectioner), though these last two employers are never seen in the show. It also contains a large speakeasy, a detective agency with an attached darkroom, and a dilapidated replica of the second floor's Manderley Bar. Frequent characters include the above, as well as Malcolm, Hecate, Agnes Naismith, and the unnamed bartender of the speakeasy.
Floor 3 – The McKittrick Hotel Residences: the Macduff family flat (including children's bedrooms, an office, a sitting area, and other spaces), the Macbeth bedroom, a cemetery, a statue garden, and indoor courtyards. Frequent characters include Lord and Lady Macduff, and Lord and Lady Macbeth.
Floor 2 – The McKittrick Hotel Lobby: Featuring a check-in desk, rotary telephone booths, a dining section, multiple sitting areas, offices, and a small cabaret stage. Frequent characters include the lobby's porter, and occasionally the three witches. This floor also contains the hotel's Manderley Bar (see above). 
Floor 1 – The McKittrick Hotel Ballroom:  This and the ground floor are a grand ballroom/auditorium and its mezzanine level, with smaller rooms surrounding the ballroom floor and balcony, including a sleeping quarters, a small crypt, and a large stage, where the finale takes place. Frequent characters include Duncan, Banquo, Catherine Campbell, and multiple characters from the other floors.

Recorded music, either period (such as tunes by the Ink Spots or Glenn Miller), ambient (composed by Punchdrunk sound designer Stephen Dobbie), or orchestral (mostly consisting of Bernard Herrmann's scores to Alfred Hitchcock films) plays steadily throughout the entire building at all times. Other sound effects, such as thunderclaps or bells, happen simultaneously on most floors as well, though with different volumes relative to the area of the performance where the sounds originate.

The story
Over the course of the guests' three-hour evening, each character plays a one-hour loop, returning to their initial location at the close of every hour, repeated roughly three times. Some characters are more stationary in their loops, while others are very active across multiple floors of the building.

 The Macbeths plot and execute several murders to ensure Macbeth is crowned King of Scotland;
 The married Lord Macduff spends his time flirting with other women and playing cards in the speakeasy;
 Lady Macduff tries to avoid the hotel's maid, before falling victim to Macbeth's rage;
 Said maid, Catherine Campbell, tries to poison Lady Macduff and her unborn child, and pines for King Duncan;
 Banquo performs several dances across many rooms, and interacts with the witches before being slain by Macbeth;
 King Duncan attends the ball in his honor and is later also murdered by Macbeth;
 Duncan's son Malcolm, a detective, hunts for clues to the seemingly supernatural mysteries of Gallow Green, along with Fulton, who seeks to protect himself from them, and Bargarran, who seems drawn to them;
 Nurse Shaw in the sanatarium is seemingly driven insane by the witches, while the isolated Matron Lang sees the future in her hut in the forest beyond;
 Agnes Naismith arrives in town to search for her sister, she interacts with many of the other characters until coming to a final, climactic encounter;
 The three witches cause chaos throughout the hotel, seducing and mystifying various characters, eventually culminating in their prophecies to Macbeth delivered in an explosive orgiastic rave;
 The hotel's Porter straightens up the lobby while looking for a mysterious object and pining for one of the witches;
 The witch goddess, Hecate, along with the speakeasy bartender (her familiar), invites guests into her sanctum for stories, and orchestrates the three witches and their supernatural events in Gallow Green.
 The ever-changing Men and Women of the Manderley Bar provide rest and respite from the chaos of the other locales.

Temporary characters who appeared for a limited time included George Islay, the missing Grace Naismith's love interest (only seen during a brief partnership between Punchdrunk and MIT); The Reverend, a pious hermit found in an igloo-like structure off one of the asylum wings, and Caroline Reville, the secretary of Malcolm's detective agency with her own ties to the supernatural. (A letter from the latter character announcing her resignation can currently be found in the agency.)

The audience is given no programme and there is no speaking from either the actors or audience (with some exceptions). The production "leads its audience on a merry, macabre chase up and down stairs, and through minimally illuminated, furniture-cluttered rooms and corridors."

The actors
The rotating cast of roughly 25 actors (including bar staff) adopt the dress and aesthetic style of the late 1930s, inspired by the shadowy and anxious atmosphere of film noir. The performers wear no masks and perform in passionate, silent group settings, solitary scenes, and often choreographed dances. Upon making a connection (usually eye contact) with a specific audience member of their choosing, a character might lead them into a small, private encounter, be it telling a story, quoting a work of Shakespeare or Hitchcock, or giving them a quest or task to complete. (These have been dubbed "one-on-ones" or "1:1s" by frequent visitors.)

The audience
Audience members are instructed only to:
Remain silent and masked at all times once they have boarded the hotel's elevator up until the time they return to the Manderley Bar; 
 Refrain from using phones or cameras.
 Keep a respectful distance from performers.

Audience members are encouraged (non-verbally) to:
Wear comfortable shoes;
Move freely at their own leisure for up to three hours, choosing where to go and what to see, so that everyone's journey is unique; (they may also feel free to exit the premises at any point);
Follow one or any of the actors throughout the performance;
Maintain eye contact with an actor on occasions when said actor notices them (this could lead to a private one-on-one encounter with a character);
Independently explore the many rooms of the building; in groups or alone;
Investigate by opening drawers and doors, and examining the numerous and detailed props found throughout the set, including written documents, clothes, sweets, etc.

The McKittrick Hotel
Sleep No More takes place at the fictional McKittrick Hotel, a reference to the film Vertigo (the hotel's fully functional Manderley Bar is a reference to another Hitchcock film, Rebecca). According to the fictitious description on its official website, the hotel was completed in 1939 and "intended to be New York City's finest and most decadent luxury hotel." The site goes on to explain that "six weeks before opening, and two days after the outbreak of World War II, the legendary hotel was condemned and left locked, permanently sealed from the public" until it was restored and reinvented by Punchdrunk and Emursive.

The McKittrick Hotel is actually three adjoining warehouses in Chelsea's gallery district at 530 West 27th Street. The address is the former home of megaclubs Twilo, Spirit, Guesthouse, Home, Bed and more. The  space has been transformed by Punchdrunk into "some 100 rooms and environments, including a spooky hospital, mossy garden and bloody bedroom."

In addition to the Manderley Bar, the McKittrick Hotel hosts several other venues to complement the theme and setting of the show. The sixth floor of the building houses The Heath, a restaurant made to resemble a 1930s train car. The small indoor entrance to the sixth floor represents the train stop in a station, with a period advertisement board, train schedule, and newspaper booth (which serves as a box office for Sleep No More). Gallow Green, a larger rooftop bar to complement the Manderley, sits atop the building. In the winter months, this is often converted to "The Lodge at Gallow Green", a large, indoor bothy-like structure put up over a large area of the roof which gives guests a similar sensory experience as Sleep No More, including a bunk bed, bookshelves to peruse, and drawers to open.

The McKittrick Hotel produces with EMURSIVE and hosts a number of events, sometimes related to the story and characters of Sleep No More, sometimes not. These include SuperCinema, an occasional dance party and masquerade themed around a film (such as The Wizard of Oz or Clue); Inferno, an annual Halloween party; and occasional parties and events for New Year's, Valentine's Day, etc.

In November 2016 for what was, at the time, a 10-week limited engagement, the McKittrick Hotel partnered with the National Theater of Scotland to bring David Greig's musical The Strange Undoing of Prudencia Hart to The Heath restaurant. Hart'''s run was extended in January 2017, when the Hotel also announced a new series of parties for the year, "The McKittrick Masquerades", promising to reveal more about the Hotel and its residents. The Strange Undoing of Prudencia Hart played its final performance in the Heath on April 23, 2017.

In 2018 the Heath was re-purposed and partitioned in two. The new space has played host to at least two new events. The Lost Supper was billed as a "Hypnotic dinner" and offered a mixture of dining and cabaret performance. It drew on some of the David Lynch–inspired tones of Sleep No More, but was not directly related to the show. It finished its run on September 9, 2018. The space is also used for the weekly Bartschland Follies, a late-night show headed by Susanne Bartsch involving a mix of cabaret and burlesque.

Reception

Critical response
Critics have favorably compared the production to other works from a wide range of media, with New York Magazine's Scott Brown referencing BioShock, Lost, Inception, and M. C. Escher, and The New York Times’ Ben Brantley referencing Stanley Kubrick, Joseph Cornell, David Lynch and Disney's Haunted Mansion. The production is mostly wordless, prompting The New Yorker's Hilton Als to write: "Because language is abandoned outside the lounge, we’re forced to imagine it, or to make narrative cohesion of events that are unfolding right before our eyes. We can only watch as the performers reduce theatre to its rudiments: bodies moving in space. Stripped of what we usually expect of a theatrical performance, we’re drawn more and more to the panic the piece incites, and the anxiety that keeps us moving from floor to floor." Testimonials for Sleep No More have also been given by such celebrities as Neil Patrick Harris, Emma Stone, Leslie Odom, Jr., Evan Rachel Wood, and Aaron Paul, all of whom have also appeared as guest characters in the production.

The show has received positive reviews in several publications including, The New York Times, New York Magazine, The New York Post, and Time Out New York, as well as a critical essay in The New Yorker and the cover article of the August 2011 Vanity Fair.

Audience response
As of March 2021, Sleep No More currently has an average rating of 4 out of 5 stars on Yelp, based on 1,284 reviews, with 70% of all reviews being 4 stars or above. Similarly, on TripAdvisor, Sleep No More has garnered 1,625 customer reviews, with 77% being either 4 or 5 stars. Many longtime fans of the show (some of whom have visited the McKittrick over 100 times) have also created dedicated blogs on sites such as Tumblr, where they share their experiences, reviews, and derivative fan works based on the show, story, characters, and cast.

Controversy
Actors have alleged sexual misconduct by audience members.

 Shanghai 
On July 13, 2016, Punchdrunk announced that Sleep No More would make its Asian premiere in Shanghai in December of the same year. This would be the first co-production between Punchdrunk International and Chinese company SMG Live.

The Shanghai production of Sleep No More is housed in a disused building five stories high, renamed the "McKinnon Hotel", in the Jing'an District of the city.

The original creative team behind Punchdrunk's Sleep No More all worked on the Shanghai production, but the company is made up of long-term Punchdrunk collaborators as well as Chinese performers working with Punchdrunk for the first time.

It combines the original story from Macbeth'' with Chinese folk myths for the Chinese audience.

References

2011 plays
Plays and musicals based on Macbeth
Site-specific theatre
Immersive entertainment